is a small asteroid discovered on 3 March 2000, and the only known quasi-satellite of the dwarf planet asteroid 1 Ceres. From the perspective of Ceres, its orbit traces an analemma.

References

External links 
 

76146
Discoveries by LINEAR
Ceres (dwarf planet)
20000303
76146